John Wesley Voight Jr. (September 22, 1926 –June 9, 1993
) was an American sprinter. Voight was a Maryland native, and lived in various towns across the state his entire life.

References

1926 births
1993 deaths
American male sprinters
Athletes (track and field) at the 1951 Pan American Games
Pan American Games medalists in athletics (track and field)
Pan American Games gold medalists for the United States
Medalists at the 1951 Pan American Games